Lewis Oliver Haldane (born 13 March 1985) is a Welsh former under-21 international footballer who scored 75 goals in 414 league and cup games in a 14-year career.

A winger, he was a youth player at Southampton and Trowbridge Town, before he turned professional at Bristol Rovers in 2002. Loaned out to non-league Weston-super-Mare, he broke through into the Rovers first team in 2003–04. He was loaned out to Conference club Forest Green Rovers for a part of the 2004–05 and 2005–06 campaigns. He then stormed into the Bristol Rovers first team picture with sixty appearances in 2006–07. At the end of the season he helped the club to win promotion into League One through the play-offs, and he also played in the club's defeat in the League Trophy final. A first team regular in 2007–08, he then lost his place and spent the 2008–09 season on loan at Conference side Oxford United.

He joined Port Vale on loan at the start of the 2009–10 season, before joining the club permanently in January 2010. He recovered from a serious infection following an insect bite sustained at the start of the 2010–11 season, only to be struck down with a broken leg at the start of the 2011–12 campaign. The injury eventually forced him to retire from professional football in October 2012, though he later returned to play semi-professionally with Yate Town, before signing for Frome Town in November 2014. He returned to Yate Town in January 2016.

Club career

Bristol Rovers
Haldane was a product of the Southampton youth academy. He moved on to Bristol Rovers though for the 2002–03 season, and had a brief spell on 'work experience' at Southern League side Weston-super-Mare. His professional debut at the Memorial Stadium came on 27 September 2003 as he replaced Junior Agogo as an 85th-minute substitute; despite only playing for a few minutes he won a penalty in a 2–0 win over Cheltenham Town. His first goal came seven days later at Belle Vue, the sole consolation of a 5–1 drubbing by Doncaster Rovers; he scored minutes after coming onto the pitch. His first start came a week later, at Darlington, where he scored the opener of a 4–0 victory. He made it three in three on 14 October, as Rovers crashed out of the League Trophy with a 2–1 defeat by Southend United at Roots Hall. He finished the 2003–04 season with 29 appearances to his name, scoring six goals and also picking up seven yellow cards. At the end of the season he was one of the few players retained, as eleven were let go. He went on to sign a new three-year deal in November 2004.

The teenager made sixteen appearances in 2004–05, all but one as a substitute, picking up one goal against Leyton Orient in the League Trophy. In April 2005 he joined Conference club Forest Green Rovers on loan. He played six games before returning to Bristol, following the dismissal of manager Ian Atkins. He began the 2005–06 season on loan at Forest Green, putting in seven appearances before heading back to Rovers in September. He played 32 games for the League Two side, scoring three goals, two of them at the end of season clash with Macclesfield Town. During the season, he was utilized on the right of midfield, rather than his usual role as a striker.

He played a remarkable sixty competitive games in 2006–07. The highlights of the season included playing in the League Trophy final at the Millennium Stadium and playing in the play–off final at Wembley Stadium. In the League Trophy final the "Gas" lost 3–2 to Doncaster Rovers, a game in which Haldane was man of the match, but at the play-off final at Wembley they defeated Shrewsbury Town 3–1. Haldane started both games, but finished neither. At the end of the season he put pen to paper on a three-year contract.

He made 38 appearances in 2007–08, as the "Pirates" adapted to life playing at a higher level. His only goal of the campaign was a late winning header over Millwall on 17 November. At the reverse fixture he set up Craig Disley's winning goal. He joined Oxford United on a season-long loan in July 2008, following the arrival of Jeff Hughes at Rovers. He played 46 games for the Conference side, but remained on the transfer list at the Memorial Stadium upon his return.

Port Vale
In August 2009, he joined Port Vale for a trial period. This came despite talk of a loan move to Newport County. He started a loan spell at Vale Park on 1 September, hopeful of later earning a permanent deal with the club. The one-month loan was extended by another month to keep him in Vale colours for October, before the deal was extended once again in November. Spending the maximum allowed loan time at Vale Park (93 days), he scored once in a total of twenty appearances. He remained in training with the club, hopeful of a short-term contract in January 2010.

Due to sign permanently for the "Vale", he was instead only able to re-join the club on loan on 31 December 2009, having failed to gain a release from Rovers. That release was eventually secured however, and Haldane signed for Vale on 27 January 2010, just days before the transfer window closed. He was sent off in his first game as a fully signed Vale player, to his great disappointment. He was offered a new contract by the club at the end of the season, and quickly signed the two-year deal.

In the 2010–11 pre-season, Haldane was rushed into hospital after being bitten by a blandford fly during a training session. The unusual illness kept him bed stricken, and cost him his place in the team's trip to Ireland, giving Gary Roberts a chance to earn a contract. He spent two weeks in hospital. He had to wait until November before he had returned to match fitness, and even longer before returning to full fitness. Following his recovery he managed to finish the season with 27 appearances to his name.

Haldane won his first start of the 2011–12 campaign in a League Trophy clash with Tranmere Rovers; however he landed awkwardly after an aerial challenge, the result of which was a double leg break and another lengthy spell on the sidelines. By January 2012 the bone had completely healed, however manager Micky Adams confirmed that another operation looked likely. Three months later he took to the field again in a reserve team clash with Burton Albion. He was given the opportunity to prove his fitness when he was offered a new six-month contract in May 2012. However two months later he went under the knife again to remove scar tissue from his left ankle. The leg injury proved too severe, and his retirement was officially announced on 7 October.

Non-league
Haldane began the 2013–14 season with Southern League side Yate Town. He helped the "Bluebells" to a ninth place in Division One South & West in 2013–14, and was a prolific goalscorer, managing to score two consecutive hat-tricks in February. He rejected an approach from Paulton Rovers in August 2014, and three months later instead joined Frome Town. The "Robins" finished one place above the Southern League Premier Division relegation zone in 2014–15. He re-signed with Yate Town in January 2016. Yate finished 16th in Division One South & West in 2015–16, but Haldane was unable to feature due to work commitments.

International career
Although Haldane was born in Trowbridge, Wiltshire, due to parentage he had Welsh eligibility, and was called up to the under-21 squad for the first time in August 2006. His only under-21 cap came in a goalless draw with Turkey on 2 September 2006.

In February 2009, Haldane was selected to represent England C for the fixture against Malta under-21s. However, he was forced to withdraw because he had previously represented Wales at under-21 level.

Style of play
Haldane was a pacey winger, adept at working either flank. In January 2005, Bristol Rovers assistant coach Kevan Broadhurst said that "He gets into good areas but he needs to improve on the physical and finishing side of his game. He doesn't quite have the end product and he's too willing to go down under a tackle rather than fight for the ball."

Personal life
Already boasting a considerable amount of body art, Haldane had his girlfriend's name (Michelle) tattooed onto his torso in February 2010 as a Valentine's Day gesture. After retiring as a professional footballer in October 2012 he began working for a lorry components company in Bristol.

Career statistics

Honours
Bristol Rovers
Football League Trophy runner-up: 2007
League Two play-offs : 2007

References

External links

People from Trowbridge
Welsh footballers
Wales under-21 international footballers
Association football wingers
Trowbridge Town F.C. players
Bristol Rovers F.C. players
Weston-super-Mare A.F.C. players
Forest Green Rovers F.C. players
Oxford United F.C. players
Port Vale F.C. players
Yate Town F.C. players
Frome Town F.C. players
Southern Football League players
English Football League players
National League (English football) players
1985 births
Living people